Royal Air Force Perranporth or more simply RAF Perranporth is a former Royal Air Force satellite station situated near Perranporth, Cornwall, in the United Kingdom.

History

The 330 acre (134 hectares) airfield was built as an RAFFighter Command station in the Second World War in 1941 and is situated on Cligga cliffs in the north of Cornwall.

Rare 1942 film footage of RAF pilots and Spitfires at RAF Perranporth is shown on the BBC website.

Units

Current use
The airfield was later converted to civilian use as Perranporth Airfield; it currently has three hard surface runways and two grass strips.

References

Citations

Bibliography

Royal Air Force stations in Cornwall
Military history of Cornwall